The German Leather Museum (Deutsches Ledermuseum), located in Offenbach am Main, Hesse, Germany, is one of the largest leather museums in the world. It has a wide variety of leather items, including some exhibits, which are believed to be more than 3,000 years old. It was founded by Hugo Eberhardt in 1917.

The museum has three wings, namely, the German Shoe Museum, the Museum for Applied Art and the Ethnology Museum. The museum has a number of leather items on display including shoes, saddles, bookcases, photo albums, leather furniture, and toys.

Bibliothek

Publications

See also 
 Museumsufer

References

Sources

External links 

 
 

 

Museums in Offenbach am Main
Decorative arts museums in Germany
Shoe museums
Leather museums
Museums established in 1917
1917 establishments in Germany